Carla Brunozzi  (born 20 April 1976, in Teramo) is an Italian footballer who played as a goalkeeper for the Italy women's national football team. She was part of the team at the UEFA Women's Euro 2001 and UEFA Women's Euro 2005.

References

External links
  UEFA player profile

1976 births
Living people
Italian women's footballers
Italy women's international footballers
People from Teramo
Women's association football goalkeepers
Footballers from Abruzzo
Sportspeople from the Province of Teramo